4-Chloromethcathinone (also known as 4-CMC and Clephedrone) is a stimulant drug of the cathinone class that has been sold online as a designer drug.

The exact pharmacology of 4-CMC is unknown, though it is probably a dopamine and serotonin releasing agent. Its chemical structure closely resembles para-Chloromethamphetamine and studies involving mice indicate that it is neurotoxic.

Legality 

Clephedrone is an Anlage I controlled drug in Germany.

Sweden's public health agency suggested classifying 4-Chloromethcathinone (klefedron) as illegal narcotic on June 1, 2015.

As of October 2015 4-CMC is a controlled substance in China.

4-CMC is considered a Schedule 1 substance in Virginia.

In December 2019, the UNODC announced scheduling recommendations placing 4-CMC into Schedule II.

See also 
 3-Chloromethcathinone
 3-Methylmethcathinone
 4-Bromomethcathinone
 4-Chloroamphetamine
 4-Cl-3-MMC
 4Cl-PVP
 4-Ethylmethcathinone
 4-Methylmethcathinone
 Substituted cathinone

References 

Cathinones
Designer drugs
Chlorobenzenes
Serotonin-norepinephrine-dopamine releasing agents